NGC 455 is a lenticular galaxy of type S? located in the constellation Pisces. It was discovered on October 27, 1864 by Albert Marth. It was described by Dreyer as "faint, very small, almost stellar."

References

External links
 

0455
18641027
Pisces (constellation)
Lenticular galaxies
815
4572